Vera is a British crime drama series based on the Vera Stanhope series of novels written by crime writer Ann Cleeves. It was first broadcast on ITV on 1 May 2011, and to date, twelve series have aired, with the latest concluding on 19 February 2023. The series stars Brenda Blethyn as the principal character, Detective Chief Inspector Vera Stanhope.

On 27 August 2020, it was confirmed that the show had been renewed for an eleventh series. Its first four episodes aired in August 2021 and January 2022, with a further two episodes confirmed to air in January 2023. In March 2022, it was confirmed that a twelfth series had been commissioned and had begun filming. The twelfth series premiered on 29 January 2023, a week after the final episode of Series 11 was broadcast.

Premise
Vera is a nearly retired employee of the fictional 'Northumberland & City Police', who is obsessive about her work and driven by her own demons. She plods along in a constantly dishevelled state, but has a calculating mind and, despite her irascible personality, she cares deeply about her work and colleagues.  She often proves her superior skills by picking up small errors in her team members' thought processes.  Vera forms a close relationship with sergeants Joe Ashworth (David Leon) and Aiden Healy (Kenny Doughty).

Production
Hidden Depths, Telling Tales and The Crow Trap from the first series, and Silent Voices from the second series, are based on the novels of the same names by Ann Cleeves. The episode Sandancers from the second series was due to be broadcast on Sunday, 13 May 2012. However, the episode was pulled from the schedule as its storyline was about a soldier's death in Afghanistan and it coincided with news of two servicemen dying there.

In August 2012, Vera was renewed for a third series of four episodes, with both Brenda Blethyn and David Leon confirmed as returning for the new series. Filming on the third series finished in February 2013. The last three episodes of the series were broadcast in a later timeslot, from 9:00pm–11:00pm.

On 22 April 2013, ITV renewed Vera for a fourth series, before the third series had even been broadcast. Filming on the fourth series completed in October 2013, and included an adaptation of the then-unpublished novel On Harbour Street, which was subsequently published in January 2014, ahead of the TV broadcast. This made the opening episode the first since the second series to be a direct adaptation from the Vera novels and leaves The Glass Room as the only novel yet to be filmed.

On 5 June 2014, ITV announced that a fifth series had been commissioned but that David Leon would not be returning. Kenny Doughty was unveiled as his successor. Latisha Knight was announced as executive producer for this series. Cush Jumbo returned to the main cast following her two episode guest stint in series two, while Lisa Hammond joined the cast as newcomer Helen Milton.

In March 2015, ITV announced that the show had been renewed for a sixth series, with filming commencing in June. The third episode was announced to be an adaptation of the novel The Moth Catcher, which was set to be published in September 2015. Noof McEwan joined the cast following the departure of Cush Jumbo.

On 14 January 2020, while attending the TCA Press Tour, Brenda Blethyn confirmed that Vera was renewed for an eleventh series. Production for series 11 began in April 2020 and new episodes began airing in 2021.  a twelfth series had begun production.

Cast

Riley Jones appeared in two episodes as PC Mark Edwards, once in Series 1 and once in series 2 before being transferred into CID and joining the main cast in series 3.

Clare Calbraith appeared in one episode as RMP Captain Rebecca Shepherd in series 2, before joining the main cast in series 3 as a detective constable.

Episodes

Series overview

Series 1 (2011)

Series 2 (2012)

Series 3 (2013)

Series 4 (2014)

Series 5 (2015)

Series 6 (2016)

Series 7 (2017)

Series 8 (2018)

Series 9 (2019)

Series 10 (2020)

Series 11 (2021–2023)

Series 12 (2023)

ITV had announced that the 12th series has been commissioned and filming began in March 2022. It began airing on BritBox on 29 January 2023.

International broadcast
 In Australia, the first series was broadcast on the Seven Network. Series 2 was shown on 7Two from Wednesday 18 July 2012 at 8:30 pm. Series 3 commenced on ABC1 on Sunday 23 August 2015 at 8:30 pm and was immediately followed by series 4. The ABC reverted to series 1 episode 1 on Sunday 27 December 2015 at 8:30 pm, and has continued to broadcast the programme since. Series 5 commenced on Sunday 28 August at 8:30 pm, and series 6 on Sunday 5 March 2017, in the same timeslot.
 On Australian subscription TV provider Foxtel, series 1–5 is aired every weekend at 8:30 pm and series 6 began airing on Monday 7 March 2016 and aired every Monday at 8:30 pm on 13th Street Channel 118, with episode 4 airing on 28 March 2016. 
 In Canada, Knowledge Network (British Columbia) aired series 1 beginning in December 2014. Series 1-12 are available for online streaming exclusively with a Britbox direct subscription or through BritBox on Amazon Video.
 In Denmark, the national public service broadcaster DR aired the four first episodes on their popular channel DR1 late Sunday evenings. In 2013, series 2 was broadcast on DR1 on Saturday evenings, rather than Sunday evenings. Likewise, series 3 and 4 were broadcast on Saturday evenings, in autumn 2014, on DR1.
 In the United States, the series is broadcast on public television stations. Series One was also available in the U.S. for online streaming via the Netflix service. All 10 series are available for online streaming via Amazon Video, Acorn TV (series 7), Britbox (series 1-12).
 In Finland the national broadcasting company Yle started airing all episodes starting on 21 December 2012 on Friday nights at 7pm.
 In The Netherlands the series is aired by KRO-NCRV on NPO 1; repeats commenced on RTL8 in 2021, starting from Season One.
 In Belgium, Flemish-speaking channel Eén started airing the series. 
 In New Zealand the series is shown on TV One and more recently on Vibe, a SKY channel.
 In Italy the series was shown on Giallo since 10 October 2016.
 In Germany the series was shown on ZDFneo before moving to Sat.1 Gold in June 2019.
 In Croatia the series is shown on HRT2.
 In Spain the series is shown on La 2 , and TV3 in Catalan
 In Portugal the first series was shown on public broadcaster RTP2. It was repeated and subsequent series shown on Fox Crime from 2013.
 In Norway the series is shown on public service broadcaster NRK.
 In France the series is shown on France 3, starting from Sunday 11 January 2015.
 In Hungary the series is shown on Galaxy4.
 In Slovenia the series is shown on RTVSLO.
 In Poland the series is shown on Ale Kino+.
 In Sweden the first series started on 3 July 2015 on SVT.
 In South Africa the series is shown on DSTV ITV Choice. Series 6 was to be broadcast 24 hours after first showing in the UK.
 In Japan the series is shown on AXN Mystery.
In Ireland the series is shown regularly on Virgin Media Three.

Home releases

Notes

References

External links

2011 British television series debuts
2010s British crime drama television series
2010s British mystery television series
2020s British crime drama television series
2020s British mystery television series
City of Sunderland
British detective television series
English-language television shows
ITV television dramas
Television series by ITV Studios
Television shows set in County Durham
Television shows set in Newcastle upon Tyne
Television shows set in Tyne and Wear
Television shows set in Northumberland